A number of ships have been named Aorangi, after Aoraki / Mount Cook (Maori:Aorangi):

Ship names